BioSpectrum is an English language Indian biotech magazine which focuses on topics in the field of pharma, agriculture, bioinformatics including news on corporates involved at the R&D or industrial manufacturing or product/service distribution levels in the biotechnology chain.

The magazine is published in two editions - BioSpectrum India and BioSpectrum Asia. BioSpectrum India was first published in March 2003. It was part of the Cyber Media Limited until September 2013 when it was acquired by MM Activ. Its sister magazines under the Cyber Media banner included PCQuest, Dataquest and MIT's Technology Review India. The headquarters of BioSpectrum is in Bangalore.

References

External links
 Official website

English-language magazines published in India
Monthly magazines published in India
Science and technology magazines published in India
Magazines established in 2003
Mass media in Bangalore
2003 establishments in Karnataka